Magdalena Municipality is the first municipal section of the Iténez Province in the Beni Department in Bolivia. Its seat is Magdalena.

References 

 National Institute of Statistics of Bolivia

Municipalities of Beni Department